These are the international rankings of Papua New Guinea.

International rankings

References

Papua New Guinea